

Winners of South East Asian Junior and Cadet Table Tennis Championships

Juniors (U-18)

Cadets (U-15)

Results of SEATTA Junior and Cadet Championships Events
The tables below are  South East Asian Junior and Cadet Table Tennis Champions lists of events (Boys' and Girls' Singles, Boys', Girls', and Mixed Doubles, and Boys' and Girls' Team).

Juniors (U-18)

Junior Boys' Singles

Junior Girls' Singles

Junior Boys' Doubles

Junior Girls' Doubles

Junior Mixed Doubles

Junior Boys' Team

Junior Girls' Team

Cadets (U-15)

Cadet Boys' Singles

Cadet Girls' Singles

Cadet Boys' Doubles

Cadet Girls' Doubles

Cadet Boys' Team

Cadet Girls' Team

See also
ITTF World Youth Championships
Asian Junior and Cadet Table Tennis Championships
Asian Table Tennis Union

References

ITTF Statistics
ATTU Website

Lists of table tennis players
Lists of sports medalists